Benjamin Mitchell (born 7 July 1979), is
a New Zealand actor best known for his role as Dr. TK Samuels in the soap opera Shortland Street.

Biography
Ben attended secondary school at St John's College, Hamilton, New Zealand. A personal trainer and winner of Mr. New Zealand in 1999, Mitchell moved to Auckland in 2000 to pursue an acting career. His first role was as a reporter on Shortland Street in 2000. The character he played was very contrary, and he has been typecast in many similar roles. This was followed by parts on shows including Power Rangers: Ninja Storm and Outrageous Fortune.

At the start of 2006, Mitchell joined the cast of Shortland Street as young doctor TK Samuels. One of "Shortland Street'''s most recognisable faces," Mitchell has "gained him great popularity throughout New Zealand, especially with female viewers."

In 2007 Mitchell starred alongside Bollywood actress Celina Jaitley in the film Love Has No Language, a "big budget" New Zealand-Australian co-production which was released in 2008. He also appeared in the independent New Zealand feature I'm not Harry Jenson.

Mitchell speaks fluent Te Reo Māori, and lent his support to the Maori Language Week campaigns in 2006 and 2008.

Personal life
He has two daughters and one son, The youngest daughter is called Sofia, the oldest Mila, and his son, Nico.

In 2015 he was publicly shamed for parking in a disabled car parking space.

FilmographyFather (1990)Mr. Nice Guy (1997)Reporter (2000)Stingers (TV series 2002)Power Rangers Ninja Storm (TV series 2003)Outrageous Fortune (TV series 2005)An Aggressive Gift (short 2008)Love Has No Language (2008)The Shoe Box (short 2009)I'm Not Harry Jenson. (2009)Curry Munchers (2011)Shortland Street (TV series 2006–present)The Hobbit: The Desolation of Smaug (2013)Pork Pie (film)'' (2017)

References

External links
Benjamin Mitchell profile - Official Shortland Street website

1979 births
Living people
New Zealand male Māori actors
New Zealand male television actors
Māori language revivalists
People educated at St John's College, Hamilton